Pointe-aux-Trembles station is a commuter rail station operated by Exo in the borough of Rivière-des-Prairies–Pointe-aux-Trembles, in Montreal, Quebec, Canada.

It is served by the Mascouche line.

The station is located adjacent to Rue Sherbrooke Est in Pointe-aux-Trembles. Two tracks run through the station, but only one is in active service, served by a single low-level side platform on the north side of the tracks. The station has a single exit located on Rue Sherbrooke, with stair and elevator access to an enclosed walkway leading to the platform. As a result, the station is wheelchair-accessible. A shorter emergency exit platform is located on the south side of the tracks. 

The station's parking lot and bus loop are located on the south side of the tracks, requiring an approximately 400-metre detour to reach the platform. 

An artwork by Doyon-Rivest entitled Le Quotidien Fantastique consists of a series of brightly coloured motifs on the windows of the enclosed walkway between the station headhouse and the platform.

Bus connections

Société de transport de Montréal

References

External links
 Pointe-aux-Trembles Commuter Train Station Information (RTM)
 Pointe-aux-Trembles Commuter Train Station Schedule (RTM)
 2016 STM System Map

Exo commuter rail stations
Rivière-des-Prairies–Pointe-aux-Trembles
Railway stations in Quebec